Casa Blanca is a house museum located in Old San Juan within the historic colonial section of the capital of Puerto Rico.

History
Built in 1521, it served as the first fortification of the San Juan islet. It was the residence for Juan Ponce de León and his family, and also his cousins, although de Leon died in an expedition to Florida without ever getting to occupy the structure. It was used as the residence of his descendants, until the mid-18th century.

As a fortification it served mostly as a refuge in times of attack from Taino rebels. The short rebellion ended peacefully after a commission of Caciques (Chieftains) negotiated peace. The house was built in wood but was destroyed by fire and rebuilt in stone and masonry.

Casa Blanca, it was the first governor's residence in PR when the capital was moved to the Islet of San Juan in 1521. Refurbished along 500 years it was the governors' residence until the mid 1700s when the Castle-Fortress of St. Catherine was modernised and became an actual residence-Palace then re-christened Royal Site of the Palace of St. Catherine of Siena. After the governor's moved to the end of the street, to Fortaleza, Casa Blanca, with beautiful Canary Islands-style balconies and verandas held the Royal Artillery Officer's Brotherhood (Real Cofradía de Artillería) as well as being the Official See for the Guards de Corps, for the Spanish Orders of Chivalry: Santiago, Calatrava, Montesa and Alcántara; for the military knights' i.e. San Hermenegildo, the Sovereign Order of St.John of Malta and the Pontificial Equestrian Order of the Holy Sepulchre of Jerusalem. It was increasingly in disuse until after World War II. It was rescued by the Puerto Rican Institute of Culture. The surrounding gardens were planted by Gen.Brooks the first American Military governor of the island in the 20th century.

In 1967, the complex was transferred to the government of Puerto Rico and declared a historical monument. In 1981, it was recorded in the Historic American Buildings Survey. Today, the house is a museum of 16th and 17th century artifacts managed by the Institute of Puerto Rican Culture.

See also

 La Fortaleza
 San José Church
 Old San Juan
List of the oldest buildings in Puerto Rico

References

External links

 photos, video and museum information
 A walking tour including Casa Blanca

Old San Juan, Puerto Rico
Historic house museums in Puerto Rico
Museums in San Juan, Puerto Rico
Spanish Colonial architecture in Puerto Rico
Houses completed in 1521
Official residences in Puerto Rico
16th-century establishments in Puerto Rico
1521 establishments in New Spain
Juan Ponce de León